Borrasca (Spanish Borrasca, "storm") may refer to:
 Borrasca (TV series), a Mexican telenovela
 Borrasca (podcast), an American podcast series featuring Cole Sprouse